Nannodota is a monotypic moth genus in the family Erebidae erected by George Hampson in 1911. Its only species, Nannodota minuta, was first described by Walter Rothschild in 1910. It is found in Peru.

References

Phaegopterina
Monotypic moth genera
Moths described in 1910